Lewis Emmanuel Hamilton (born 21 November 1984) is an English footballer who plays as a defender for Horsham.

Career
Hamilton made his Football League debut for Queens Park Rangers in the Championship after coming on as a substitute against Burnley at Turf Moor on 19 April 2005.

He then moved to Aldershot Town, and then Lewes, where he was part of the 2007–08 Conference South winning side. Hamilton signed for Tonbridge Angels in July 2008 after a successful trial. Hamilton left Tonbridge in December 2009 and subsequently rejoined Lewes.

Hamilton signed for Isthmian League side Horsham at the start of the 2013–14 campaign.

Honours
Lewes
Conference South: 2007–08

References

External links
Lewis Hamilton profile from tonbridgeangels.co.uk
Lewis Hamilton profile from qpr.co.uk

Lewis Hamilton plays in the FA Cup, TheMirror.co.uk

1984 births
Living people
Footballers from Derby
English footballers
Association football defenders
Derby County F.C. players
Queens Park Rangers F.C. players
Aldershot Town F.C. players
Lewes F.C. players
Tonbridge Angels F.C. players
English Football League players
National League (English football) players
Horsham F.C. players